Kimsa Phujru (Aymara kimsa three, phujru hole or pit in the earth without water, "three holes", also spelled Quimsa Phujru) is a mountain in the western extensions of the Cordillera Real in the Andes of Bolivia which reaches a height of approximately . It is located in the La Paz Department, Los Andes Province, Batallas Municipality. Kimsa Phujru lies at the Pura Purani River, an affluent of the Qiqa Jawira.

References 

Mountains of La Paz Department (Bolivia)